The Dropout is an American biographical drama miniseries that documents the disgraced biotechnology company Theranos and its founder Elizabeth Holmes, played by Amanda Seyfried. Created by Elizabeth Meriwether, the series is based on the podcast of the same name hosted by Rebecca Jarvis and produced by ABC News. 

The Dropout is the first television production to be produced by Searchlight Television. It premiered on the streaming service Hulu on March 3, 2022, and received positive reviews from critics, who praised the writing and the performances of the cast, particularly Seyfried. At the 74th Primetime Emmy Awards, the series earned six nominations, including Outstanding Limited or Anthology Series, with Seyfried winning for Outstanding Lead Actress. It was also nominated for Best Limited or Anthology Series or Television Film and Seyfried won Best Actress at the 80th Golden Globe Awards.

Synopsis
The Dropout, based on the ABC Audio podcast of the same name, is a series about the rise and fall of Elizabeth Holmes and her company, Theranos. The show touches on experiences that likely motivated Holmes's deceptions and lies in a linear fashion, starting from her preteens and all the way to her exposure as a fraud.

Cast and characters

Main
 Amanda Seyfried as Elizabeth Holmes, a Stanford University dropout who goes on to found healthcare startup Theranos
 Naveen Andrews as Sunny Balwani, Holmes' lover and Theranos' COO

Recurring/Guest
 Elizabeth Marvel as Noel Holmes, Elizabeth's mother
 Michel Gill as Chris Holmes, Elizabeth's father, a former Enron employee
 William H. Macy as Richard Fuisz, the Holmes' family acquaintance with a history of healthcare patents
 Mary Lynn Rajskub as Lorraine Fuisz, Richard's wife who behaves deferentially towards Noel 
 Bill Irwin as Channing Robertson, Holmes' chemical engineering professor at Stanford who becomes Theranos' first board member
 Utkarsh Ambudkar as Rakesh Madhava, a Theranos engineer and Holmes' former TA at Robertson's research group
 Laurie Metcalf as Phyllis Gardner, a pharmacologist who was one of Theranos' early skeptics
 Stephen Fry as Ian Gibbons, Theranos' chief scientist
 Kate Burton as Rochelle Gibbons, Ian's supportive wife
 James Hiroyuki Liao as Edmond Ku, a Theranos engineer who becomes increasingly disgruntled with the company's practices
 Michael Ironside as Don Lucas, a venture capitalist who invested in Oracle and joins Theranos' board
 Hart Bochner as Larry Ellison, Oracle CEO
 Nicky Endres as Ana Arriola, a former Apple engineer who briefly joins Theranos' design team
 Amir Arison as Avie Tevanian, a Theranos board member who casts doubts about the company's progress
 Bashir Salahuddin as Brendan Morris, an engineer hired by Holmes to develop an altogether different prototype of the Theranos machine
 Shaun J. Brown as Daniel Young, a Theranos vice president who enforces the company's culture of secrecy
 Alan Ruck as Jay "Dr. Jay" Rosan, an eccentric Walgreens executive enamored with Silicon Valley
 Josh Pais as Wade Miquelon, Walgreens CFO
 Rich Sommer as Kevin Hunter, a Walgreens-employed lab consultant who remains skeptical of Theranos
 Andrew Leeds as Roland, a Walgreens executive
 Sam Waterston as George Shultz, former United States Secretary of State and Theranos board member
 Anne Archer as Charlotte Shultz, wife of George Shultz
 Dylan Minnette as Tyler Shultz, George Shultz's grandson who interns at Theranos before becoming a whistleblower
 Kurtwood Smith as David Boies, a prominent litigator who Holmes hires as her attorney
 Michaela Watkins as Linda Tanner, Theranos' chief in-house counsel
 Sam Straley as Christian Holmes, Elizabeth's brother who is hired as Theranos' Chief of Strategic Operations
 Kevin Sussman as Mark Roessler, Theranos' lab director who helps break the story on its fraudulent practices
 Camryn Mi-Young Kim as Erika Cheung, a young Theranos employee who becomes a company whistleblower alongside Tyler Shultz
 Ebon Moss-Bachrach as John Carreyrou, a reporter for The Wall Street Journal who exposes Theranos' fraud
 LisaGay Hamilton as Judith Baker, Carreyrou's editor
 Garrett Coffey as Billy Evans, a hotel heir and Holmes' new boyfriend

Episodes

Production

Development
On April 10, 2019, Deadline Hollywood reported that Hulu had given the production a series order for 6 to 10 episodes. The series would be executive produced by Kate McKinnon, the host of The Dropout, Rebecca Jarvis, and its producers Taylor Dunn and Victoria Thompson. The series would be Searchlight Television’s inaugural production. Upon the casting of Amanda Seyfried, she also joined the miniseries as a producer while Elizabeth Meriwether, Liz Heldens, Liz Hannah, and Katherine Pope joined Dunn and Thompson as executive producers. On March 31, 2021, Michael Showalter and Jordana Mollick joined the limited series as executive producers. Showalter directed the first four episodes of the series.

Casting
Kate McKinnon was originally cast to star as Elizabeth Holmes, former CEO of Theranos. On February 18, 2021, McKinnon dropped out of the project. Though her departure did not come with an explanation, production moved forward without McKinnon. On March 29, 2021, Amanda Seyfried was cast to replace McKinnon. A day later, Naveen Andrews joined the main cast. On June 10, 2021, William H. Macy, Laurie Metcalf, Elizabeth Marvel, Utkarsh Ambudkar, Kate Burton, Stephen Fry, Michel Gill, Michael Ironside, Bill Irwin, and Josh Pais were cast in recurring roles. On August 3, 2021, Dylan Minnette, Alan Ruck, Bashir Salahuddin, Mary Lynn Rajskub, Hart Bochner, James Hiroyuki Liao, Nicky Endres, Camryn Mi-Young Kim, and Andrew Leeds were cast in recurring roles. On August 5, 2021, Sam Waterston, Kurtwood Smith and Anne Archer were cast in recurring roles. On September 14, 2021, LisaGay Hamilton, Michaela Watkins, Ebon Moss-Bachrach, Kevin Sussman, Sam Straley, and Shaun Brown joined the cast in recurring capacities.

Release
The series premiered on March 3, 2022, with the first three episodes available immediately and the rest debuting on a weekly basis on Hulu. In international markets, it was released simultaneously via Star content hub on Disney+, on Star+ in Latín America, and on Disney+ Hotstar in India and Southeast Asia.

Reception

Audience viewership
According to Parrot Analytics, which looks at consumer engagement in consumer research, streaming, downloads, and on social media, The Dropout was the 9th most in-demand new show, during the week of March 12, 2022 to March 18, 2022. According to data from Samba TV, 499,000 US households watched The Dropout in its first 4 days of streaming. According to Nielsen Holdings, The Dropout spent one week in the top ten streaming programs, during the week of March 7, 2022 to March 13, 2022. According to the streaming aggregator Reelgood, The Dropout was the 3rd most watched program across all platforms, during the week of March 24, 2022, and was the most watched tv show during the week of March 31, 2022. According to the streaming aggregator JustWatch, The Dropout was the 9th most streamed television series across all platforms in the U.S., during the week ending  April 3, 2022.

Critical response

On review aggregator website Rotten Tomatoes, the limited series holds an 89% approval rating based on 95 critic reviews, with an average rating of 7.4/10. The website's critics consensus reads, "The Dropout succeeds more as a docudrama than a dark comedy, but Amanda Seyfried's disquieting portrayal of Elizabeth Holmes brings fresh blood to this retelling of recent history." On Metacritic, the series has a score of 75 out of 100, based on 34 critics, indicating "generally favorable reviews".

Caroline Framke of Variety found the miniseries very impressive for its genuine portrait of Elizabeth Holmes, acclaimed the performances of the actors, especially Amanda Seyfried and Naveen Andrews, and said that the show skillfully manages to cover Holmes' life throughout the years flawlessly with its edits. Daniel Fienberg of The Hollywood Reporter acclaimed Seyfried for her performance, while praising the supporting cast, complimented how the miniseries manages to depict Holmes and the different aspects of her personality, and found the characterization of Holmes' entourage the show's best feature. Reviewing the series for Rolling Stone, Alan Sepinwall gave a rating of 5 out of 5 stars and described it as, "a maddening, gripping, and at times startlingly funny recreation of a story that would feel too absurd to be true if we didn't already know otherwise." Beth Webb of Empire rated the series 4 out of 5 stars, praised the performance of Seyfried and  Andrews, and found the show cohesive and entrancing. Joyce Slaton of Common Sense Media rated the miniseries 4 out of 5 stars, praised the performances of the actors, and stated that the show illustrates Holmes went too far to make a positive impact on the world. Lucy Mangan of The Guardian rated the miniseries 3 out of 5 stars, praised the performances of the actors and the story, writing, "it's clunky at points, but Amanda Seyfried excels as one-time billionaire grifter Elizabeth Holmes – and the story is simply too jaw-dropping to pass up."

Accolades

See also
 List of podcast adaptations

References

External links
 The Dropout on Hulu
 
 The Dropout on ABC Audio

2020s American drama television miniseries
2022 American television series debuts
2022 American television series endings
Hulu original programming
English-language television shows
Primetime Emmy Award-winning television series
Television series by 20th Century Fox Television
Television series by Searchlight Television
Television shows based on podcasts